The defending champion was Emilio Sánchez who lost in the semifinals. The fifth seeded, Joakim Nyström from Sweden won the singles title.

Seeds
A champion seed is indicated in bold text while text in italics indicates the round in which that seed was eliminated.

Draw

References

External links
ITF tournament edition details

Men's Singles
Swedish Open